Louis & Luca - Mission to the Moon is a 2018 Norwegian stop motion animated film directed by Rasmus A. Sivertsen from a screenplay by Karsten Fullu, based on the characters by Kjell Aukrust. A sequel to Solan og Ludvig – Herfra til Flåklypa (2015), it is the third and possibly final stop motion animated film based on Aukrust's Flåklypa universe, and the fifth film overall. The film is a co-production between Qvisten Animation and Maipo Film, and was released in Norway on 21 September 2018, distributed by Nordic Film Distribution. It grossed $4,957,487 worldwide and was met with generally positive reviews.

Premise 

Louis and Reodor decide to build a rocket to fly to the moon on behalf of Norway, with the help of Vigfus Skonken. However, Vigfus secretly wants to collect the moon dust, which contains a rare substance he calls "Vigfusium".

Voice cast 
The Norwegian voice cast for the film:
 Kari-Ann Grønsund as Louis Gundersen
 Trond Høvik as Luca
 Sjølsvik as Reodor Felgen
 Hege Schøyen as Enkefru Stengelføhn-Glad
 Steinar Sagen as Emanuel Desperados
 Fridtjov Såheim as Ollvar O. Kleppvold
 Bjarte Hjelmeland as Olram Slåpen
 John Brungot as Melvind Snerken
 Kåre Conradi as Frimand Pløsen
 Christine Hope as Nyhetsoppleser
 Ingar Helge Gimle as Vigfus Skonken

Production 
The film received a funding grant of 15.5 million Norwegian krone (US$1.7 million) from the Norwegian Film Institute in September 2015, contributing to its total budget of 47 million krone (US$5.2 million). The entire film took 120,000 still images.

Release 
Louis & Luca - Mission to the Moon was released in Norway on 21 September 2018. It opened with $1,098,555, for a total gross of $4,838,873 from 422,796 admissions, making it the second highest-grossing film in Norway from 2018. It had a worldwide gross of $4,957,487. Critically, the film received positive reviews, with particular praise aimed at its humour and animation, but with criticisms focused on its conventionality.

References

External links 
 
 
 Louis & Luca - Mission to the Moon at Filmweb.no (in Norwegian)

Films directed by Rasmus A. Sivertsen
2018 films
Moon in film
Norwegian animated films
2010s stop-motion animated films
2010s Norwegian-language films